The 2002–03 Scottish Challenge Cup was the 12th season of the competition, competed for by all 30 members of the Scottish Football League. The defending champions were Airdrieonians, who defeated Alloa Athletic 2–1 in the 2001 final.

The final was played on 20 October 2002, between Queen of the South and Brechin City at Broadwood Stadium, Cumbernauld. Queen of the South won 2–0, to win the competition for the first time.

Schedule

First round 
Alloa Athletic and Clyde received random byes into the second round.

Source: ESPN Soccernet

Second round 

Source: ESPN Soccernet

Quarter-finals

Semi-finals

Final

References

External links 
 BBC Scottish Cups page
 Scottish Football League Challenge Cup page

Scottish Challenge Cup seasons
Challenge Cup